Border Campaign may refer to:

Pancho Villa Expedition, a 1916–17 U.S. operation in Mexico
Border campaign (Irish Republican Army) or Operation Harvest, a 1956–62 guerrilla war in Northern Ireland
1960–61 campaign at the China–Burma border, after the Chinese Civil War